The following is a list of toll bridges. Toll bridges are bridges upon which traffic may pass upon payment of a fee, or a toll. This list is intended to be a subset of List of toll roads.

Australia
Sydney Harbour Bridge, Sydney
 Gateway Bridge, Brisbane
Go Between Bridge, Brisbane

Bulgaria–Romania border
Danube Bridge
New Europe Bridge 0-37 euro

Canada

British Columbia

Patullo Bridge replacement Future Toll
George Massey Tunnel replacement Future Toll

Nova Scotia
Angus L. Macdonald Bridge C$1
A. Murray MacKay Bridge C$1

Ontario
Ambassador Bridge
Blue Water Bridge
Fort Frances–International Falls International Bridge
 Gordie Howe International Bridge – scheduled to open in 2024
International Bridge
Lewiston–Queenston Bridge
Ogdensburg–Prescott International Bridge
Peace Bridge
Rainbow Bridge
Seaway International Bridge
Thousand Islands Bridge
Whirlpool Rapids Bridge

Prince Edward Island/New Brunswick
Confederation Bridge C$50.25

Quebec
 Olivier-Charbonneau Bridge $1.80-$2.40  With transponder, $6.80–$7.40 with video
 Serge Marcil Bridge $1.50

Denmark
 Øresund Bridge - connecting the Danish island of Zealand with Sweden  54 Euros
 Great Belt Bridge
Crown Princess Mary’s Bridge - The Frederikssund Connection

France
 Millau Viaduct - over the Tarn, north of Montpellier

Greece
 Rio–Antirrio Bridge - over the Gulf of Corinth, north of Patras.

Hong Kong

Former
 Tsing Ma Bridge, Ma Wan Viaduct and Kap Shui Mun Bridge, known collectively as the Lantau Link - opened in 1997, toll eliminated in 2018

India
 Aathupalam Bridge - The 32.2 metre bridge in Coimbatore, Tamil Nadu was part of the first private road project in South India.
 Bandra–Worli Sea Link - Cable-stayed, open to sea bridge in Mumbai
 DND Flyway - Connecting New Delhi with Noida and hence the name. (DND stands for Delhi–Noida Direct).
Vidyasagar Setu - Cable stayed, connects Kolkata and Howrah.

Indonesia
 Suramadu Bridge - a cable-stayed bridge between the islands of Java and Madura

Ireland

 West-Link bridge on the M50. Located between Junction 6 (N3 Blanchardstown) and Junction 7 (N4 Lucan). Barrier-free tolling  in operation.
 East-Link bridge: Officially the Tom Clarke Bridge, located in the Dublin Port area.
 Mary McAleese Boyne Valley Bridge on the M1. The Northlink Toll Plaza is located on the Dundalk Western Bypass motorway, approximately 30 km north of Dublin airport on the Dublin to Belfast route
 River Suir Bridge carries the N25 over the River Suir. The toll plaza is approximately 5 km from Waterford City.

Japan 

  - Sayama, Saitama
  - Saitama, Saitama
  - Tone, Ibaraki and Sakae, Chiba
  - Choshi, Chiba

Malaysia
 Penang Bridge
 Malaysia–Singapore Second Link
 Tun Salahuddin Bridge

Norway
 Askøy Bridge - bridge toll - Route 562
 Krifast - tunnel / bridge toll - E39
 Osterøy Bridge - bridge toll - Route 566
 Skarnsund Bridge - bridge toll - Route 755
 Straum Bridge - bridge toll - Route 661
 Svinesund Bridge - bridge toll - E6
 Sykkylven Bridge - bridge toll - Route 71
 Triangle Link - tunnel/bridge toll - E39

Portugal
 25 de Abril Bridge - in Lisbon
 Vasco da Gama Bridge - in Lisbon

Romania
Giurgeni-Vadu Oii Bridge - DN2A / E60
Cernavodă Bridge - A2 / E81

Sweden
Motala Bridge
Öresund Bridge
Sundsvall Bridge
Svinesund Bridge

Turkey
 Bosphorus Bridge - over the Bosporus strait between Ortaköy (Europe) and Beylerbeyi (Asia) in Istanbul
 Çanakkale 1915 Bridge - over the Dardanelles strait between Gelibolu (Europe) and Lapseki (Asia) in Çanakkale Province
 Fatih Sultan Mehmet Bridge - over the Bosporus strait between Armutlu (Europe) and Kavacik (Asia) in Istanbul
 Osman Gazi Bridge - over the Gulf of İzmit between Dilovası (Kocaeli) and Altınova (Yalova).
 Yavuz Sultan Selim Bridge - over the Bosporus strait between Garipçe (Europe) and Beykoz (Asia) in Istanbul

United Arab Emirates

Dubai
The Salik toll system was introduced on 1 July 2007.
 Al Garhoud Bridge, the toll gate is on the Bur Dubai side of the bridge

United Kingdom

England
 Aldwark Bridge, North Yorkshire
 Bathampton Toll Bridge
 Cartford Bridge
 Clifton Suspension Bridge, Bristol
 Dartford Crossing (Dartford Tunnel northbound, and the Queen Elizabeth II Bridge southbound)
 Dunham Bridge, Nottinghamshire/Lincolnshire
 Eling Bridge, Eling Tide Mill, Hampshire
 Humber Bridge, near Hull
 Itchen Bridge, Hampshire
 Kingsland Bridge, Shrewsbury
 Middlesbrough Transporter Bridge
 Mersey Gateway Bridge, Cheshire
 Swinford Bridge, Oxfordshire
 Tamar Bridge, Plymouth
 Warburton Toll Bridge
 Whitchurch Bridge
 Whitney-on-Wye toll bridge

Wales
 Newport Transporter Bridge
 Penmaenpool Bridge

United States

Alabama

California

Former

Colorado

Delaware / New Jersey

Florida

Indiana

Kentucky / Indiana

Illinois / Indiana

Iowa / Illinois

Louisiana

Maryland

Massachusetts

Michigan

Michigan / Ontario, Canada

Minnesota / Ontario, Canada

Missouri

Nebraska / Iowa

New Jersey

New Jersey / New York

New Jersey / Pennsylvania

New York state

New York state / Ontario, Canada

Oregon / Washington

Former

Puerto Rico

Rhode Island

Texas

Texas / Chihuahua, Mexico

Texas / Coahuila, Mexico

Texas / Nuevo León, Mexico

Texas / Tamaulipas, Mexico

Virginia

Washington state

Former

West Virginia / Ohio

See also 
 List of toll roads

References 

Toll